The Chinese in America can refer to:

Chinese American history
The Chinese in America (book), by Iris Chang